Terje Melbye Hansen (born 21 September 1948) is a Norwegian sport shooter. He was born in Kongsberg. He competed at the 1976 Summer Olympics in Montreal.

References

External links 
 

1948 births
Living people
People from Kongsberg
Norwegian male sport shooters
Olympic shooters of Norway
Shooters at the 1976 Summer Olympics
Sportspeople from Viken (county)
20th-century Norwegian people